HX1 or variation, may refer to:

HX1 post code in the UK HX postcode area
 HX1, the first of the HX convoys
 Tianwen-1 (formerly: Huoxing-1, HX-1), the first Chinese space probe to reach Mars
 Helowerks HX-1 Wasp, an ultralight helicopter
 Pentecost HX-1 Hoppi-Copter, a backpack helicopter (a personal "jet pack")
 HX1 series of RMMV HX range of tactical trucks
 Hexiang HX-1, a Chinese UAV drone

See also

 Sony CyberShot DSC-HX1 HyperXoom digital camera
 HXL (disambiguation)